Castnia is a genus of moths within the family Castniidae. It was described by Johan Christian Fabricius in 1807.

Species
 Castnia estherae Miller, 1976
 Castnia eudesmia Gray, 1838
 Castnia fernandezi González, 1992
 Castnia invaria Walker, 1854
 Castnia juturna Hopffer, 1856
 Castnia lecerfi Dalla Torre, 1913

References

Castniidae